"How Was I to Know" is a song written by Will Rambeaux and Blair Daly, and recorded by American country music artist John Michael Montgomery.  It was released in June 1997 as the fourth and final single from his album What I Do the Best.  It peaked at number 2 in the United States, and number 8 in Canada. Reba McEntire recorded an unrelated song with the same title earlier in the year, which went to number-one.

Critical reception
Chuck Taylor, of Billboard magazine reviewed the song favorably calling it a "less traditional, rather summery feel than many of his previous outings." He goes on to say that Montgomery's vocals have a "more intimate and conversational quality that's extremely effective on this lilting number."

Music video
Like his previous video "I Miss You a Little", this music video was directed by Lou Chanatry.

Chart positions

Year-end charts

References

1997 singles
John Michael Montgomery songs
Songs written by Blair Daly
Atlantic Records singles
1996 songs
Songs written by Will Rambeaux